This article shows all participating team squads at the 2001 Women's European Volleyball Championship, held in Sofia and Varna, Bulgaria from September 22 to September 30, 2001.

Pool A

Head coach: Emil Trenev

Head coach: Miroslav Čada

Head coach: Jue Gang-Bai

Head coach: Dimitrios Floros

Head coach: Costinel Stan

Head coach: Nikolay Karpol

Pool B

Head coach: Nenad Komadina

Head coach: Lee Hee-Wan

Head coach: Marco Bonitta

Head coach: Angelo Frigoni

Head coach: Zbigniew Krzyżanowski

Head coach: Gariy Yegiazarov

References
CEV
LoSportItaliano 

E
Women's European Volleyball Championships
European Volleyball Championships